Suat Kınıklıoğlu (born 1 May 1965) is a Turkish politician, writer and analyst. Kınıklıoğlu began his political career in 1995-1996 with the Democratic Left Party (DSP) in Ankara. Following a break in politics Kınıklıoğlu was elected as Member of Parliament representing Çankırı in the general election of 22 July 2007 on a Justice and Development Party (AK Party) ticket. Kınıklıoğlu was member of the executive board of the AK Party (2009-2012), deputy chairman of external affairs (2007-2011), spokesman of the foreign affairs committee in the Turkish Parliament (2007-2011), chairman of the Turkey-USA Interparliamentary Friendship Group. Since June 2011 Kınıklıoğlu has been executive director of the Center for Strategic Communication, an Ankara-based foreign policy think tank.

Education and professional career
Kınıklıoğlu was born in Duisburg, Germany.  He graduated from the Turkish Air Force Academy (Electronics) in 1986 and from Carleton University’s Political Science Department with High Honours in 1994. Kınıklıoğlu received his Master in International Relations degree in 1999 at Bilkent University, Ankara. Kınıklıoğlu specializes in Turkish domestic and foreign policy, Turkish-Russian relations and Turkey’s strategic identity.

Kınıklıoğlu has worked as communications squadron commander in the Turkish Air Force, columnist in Turkish Daily News, editor-in-chief of the foreign policy journal Insight Turkey, executive director of the  German Marshall Fund of the US Ankara office and as columnist at Radikal Daily.

In 2006 Kınıklıoğlu received the Sakip Sabanci International Research Award. In 2013 he was invited to become a member of the European Council on Foreign Relations. Kınıklıoğlu is a regular contributor to the international media including the Financial Times, Washington Post, Wall Street Journal, International Herald Tribune and the Guardian. He comments frequently to the Turkish and international media on Turkish domestic and foreign policy issues.

Political career
Kınıklıoğlu began his political career as a party functionary of the Democratic Left Party (DSP) in Ankara. Upon being invited by Prime Minister Bulent Ecevit to the DSP he contributed to the DSP’s work from 1995 to 1996. Following a shuffle in the local party branches he decided to give politics a break. In 2007, he wrote a piece to the International Herald Tribune titled “Getting Turkey Right” and caught the attention of then-foreign minister now President Abdullah Gül. He was elected Member of Parliament in the 22 July 2007 general election representing Çankırı.  From 2007 to 2012 he was spokesman of the Turkish Parliament's Foreign Affairs Committee, chairman of the Turkey - US Interparliamentary Friendship Group, chairman of the Turkey - UK Interparliamentary Friendship Group (2007-2010),  member of the AK Party Executive Board and Deputy Chairman of AK Party External Affairs.

In 2014 Kınıklıoğlu managed the Ankara mayoral election campaign of Mansur Yavaş who ran on a Republican People's Party (CHP) ticket. The election caught the attention of the country and is claimed to have been won by Mansur Yavaş. Yet, his controversial opponent Melih Gokcek was announced as winner. Since 2012 Kiniklioglu is independent and has no affiliation with any of Turkey's political parties.

Select bibliography

References

1965 births
Living people
Democratic Left Party (Turkey) politicians
Members of the Grand National Assembly of Turkey
People from Duisburg
Bilkent University alumni
Members of the 23rd Parliament of Turkey